Swami Prameyananda (April 1933 – October 20, 2011) was a vice-president of the Ramakrishna Order. He was born Ramgopal Bhattacharya in the village of Kani-shail in the Sylhet district of what is today Bangladesh, into an orthodox brahmin family. He joined the Ramakrishna Order in 1951 at its Karimganj center. In 1957, he received mantra and Brahmacharya diksha from Swami Shankarananda, receiving the name Premesha Chaitanya, and in 1961 he received Sannyasa and the name Swami Prameyananda from his guru. In 1966, he became secretary to Swami Vireshwarananda, the tenth president of the Order, and served him until the latter's death in 1985. Thereafter, he became the editor of the Bengali-language monthly Udbodhan from November 1985 to September 1987. In April 1987 he was made a trustee of the Ramakrishna Math, and in September came to Belur Math to become the manager. He held that post until he was made a vice president on February 27, 2009. During his tenure as vice president, he granted mantra diksha to 13,066 spiritual seekers. 

On October 19, 2011, The Hindu reported that Prameyananda's condition was critical, as he had been admitted to the Ramakrishna Mission Seva Pratisthan on October 9, and had been on life-support system since October 17. He died at 8:25 am on October 20. The Times of India reported that "People came from all over the country to bid adieu."

References

Bibliography 
 Swami Prameyananda (2011: Swami Atmasthananda, Belur Math) PDF version online

Monks of the Ramakrishna Mission